Ruine Ligist is a castle in Styria, Austria. Ruine Ligist is situated at an elevation of 386 m.

See also

List of castles in Austria

References

This article was initially translated from the German Wikipedia.
Castles in Styria